Patersonia graminea, commonly known as grass-leaved patersonia, is a species of plant in the iris family Iridaceae and is endemic to the south-west of Western Australia. It is a clump-forming herb with linear, grass-like leaves and pale violet tepals.

Description
Patersonia graminea is a rhizome-forming herb that forms dense clumps. Flowering mainly occurs from September to October.

Taxonomy and naming
Patersonia graminea was first described in 1873 by George Bentham in Flora Australiensis, from specimens collected by James Drummond. The specific epithet (graminea) means "grass-like".

Distribution and habitat
Grass-leaved patersonia grows in heath and scrub on sandplains and granite outcrops from the coast of south-western Western Australia near the Murchison River to near Watheroo, in the Avon Wheatbelt, Geraldton Sandplains and Yalgoo biogeographic regions.

Conservation status
Patersonia graminea is listed as "not threatened" by the Government of Western Australia Department of Biodiversity, Conservation and Attractions.

References

graminea
Flora of Western Australia
Plants described in 1873
Taxa named by George Bentham